Mount Gahinga is a dormant/extinct volcano in the Virunga Mountains on the border between Rwanda and Uganda. Gahinga lies between Muhabura and Sabyinyo, but is the smallest of these three. Mount Gahinga, also known in the local Kinyarwanda/Rufumbira dialect as "a small pile of stones", has a swampy caldera on its peak. Mgahinga Gorilla National Park also got its name from this volcano. The volcano chain spans across Uganda, Rwanda and the Democratic Republic of Congo.

The vegetation across the mountain can be described as afro-montane with bamboo composing the main vegetation. Like Muhabura and Sabyinyo, the bamboo forests on Mount Gahinga are a habitat of the endangered mountain gorilla. There are several other species of animals and birds that form part of the Mount Gahinga ecosystem. The golden monkeys are notable to these.

References

Notes

Virunga Mountains
International mountains of Africa
Volcanoes of Africa
Mountains of Rwanda
Mountains of Uganda
Stratovolcanoes of Rwanda
Stratovolcanoes of Uganda
Mount Gahinga
Rwanda–Uganda border
Three-thousanders